Big Bazaar was an Indian retail chain of hypermarkets, discount department stores, and grocery stores. The retail chain was founded by Kishore Biyani under his parent organisation Future Group, which is known for having a significant prominence in Indian retail and fashion sectors. Big Bazaar is also the parent chain of Food Bazaar, Fashion at Big Bazaar (abbreviated as fbb) and eZone where at locations it houses all under one roof, while it is sister chain of retail outlets like Brand Factory, Home Town, Central, eZone, etc.

Founded in 2001, Big Bazaar is one of the oldest and largest hypermarket chains of India, housing about 300+ stores in over 120 cities and towns across the country. In February 2022, Reliance Industries took control of over 200 Future group stores and rebranded Big Bazaar as Reliance's Smart Bazaar Stores.

History 
Big Bazaar was founded in 2001 by Kishore Biyani, the founder and chief executive officer (CEO) of the parent company, the Future Group.

The former captain of Indian cricket team, Mahendra Singh Dhoni have previously endorsed for the fashion vertical of Big Bazaar.

Acquisition 

In 2020, Big Bazaar was acquired by Reliance Retail, the retail division of the Reliance Industries, as part of a ₹24,713 crore ($3.36 billion) sale transaction of Future Group. However, the deal was called off on 23 April 2022 after FRL's creditors voted against going forward with it.

See also 

 D-Mart
 Foodworld
 HyperCity
 More.
 Urban Ladder
 Reliance Fresh
 Spencer's
 NRI Bazaar | More

References

External links

Companies based in Mumbai
Retail companies of India
Supermarkets of India
Retail companies established in 2001
Indian companies established in 2001
2001 establishments in Maharashtra
Future Group